Erik Bulatov (born September 5, 1933 in Sverdlovsk) is a Russian artist, who was raised in Moscow. His father was a communist party official who died in World War II at Pskov, and his mother fled Poland at age 15 in support of the Russian Revolution. Bulatov's works are in the major public and private collections in Europe, Russia and United States. In 2008 Bulatov became an honorary member of the Russian Academy of Arts.

Early life

Education 
Bulatov studied painting at the Surikov Art Institute in Moscow, graduating in 1958.  He began working as a children’s book illustrator with friend and collaborator, Oleg Vassiliev for which he won numerous awards. Both artists were immensely influenced by Robert Falk and Vladimir Favorsky two artists of the early-twentieth century Russian avant-garde.

Sretensky Boulevard Group 
In the 1960s Bulatov formed the Sretensky Boulevard Group with Ilya Kabakov, Edik Steinberg, Oleg Vassiliev, Vladimir Yankilevsky, and Viktor Pivovarov.  Named by a Czech historian for the block on which they lived, the group often met at Kabakov's to discuss and show their work as they were not permitted to do so in "official" settings.  This group was more of an association of like-minded artists rather than a school with similar stylistic tendencies.

Through the Sretensky Boulevard Group, Bulatov became a prominent member of the loosely affiliated Moscow Conceptualists.  This group, related ideologically rather than stylistically, has defined the "Moscow School" of contemporary Russian art as it is known today.

Style 
It is thought that Bulatov works in sots art style. "Bulatov's paintings are large, colorful, realistic images of landscapes, skies, urban settings, and people, many of which are painted over and partially obscured by wry words or phrases. Metaphorically rich and poetic blue skies are overlaid with Russian texts that translate: 'Glory to the U.S.S.R.' or 'Trademark'. Lush, green landscapes toil under the labels 'Not To Be Leaned On' or 'Caution.' But Bulatov in one of his recent interview indicates that he has nothing to do with Sots Art. Sots Art according Bulatov is an irony. And irony is absent in his work.

Bulatov's subject matter is broad. Equally broad is his perception of the government's role in the classification and control of everything. Bulatov symbolizes the government through his use of language as a system of order and control, the foundation of written law and constraint which he then plasters on every tree and rock. It is in this sense that Bulatov's paintings may take on a more universal accuracy and a more populist appeal. His emphasis on only the public and external aspects of life--the street, the land, the State television broadcast--reinforces the notion that one's thoughts and feelings are (still) one's own. the psychological and emotional are beyond the confines of words, language and law."

Career 

Erik Bulatov is currently represented by ARNDT Berlin, SKOPIA Geneva and pop/off/art gallery Moscow - Berlin.

Public collections
 The State Russian Museum, St. Petersburg, Russia
 The State Tretyakov Gallery, Moscow, Russia
 The State Hermitage Museum, St. Petersburg, Russia
 The Solomon R. Guggenheim Museum, New York
 Centre Georges Pompidou, Paris, France
 The Garage Museum of Contemporary Art, Moscow, Russia
 The Moscow Museum of Modern Art (MMoMA), Moscow, Russia
 The National Centre for Contemporary Arts, Moscow, Russia
 The ART4.RU Museum of Contemporary Russian Art, Moscow, Russia
 The Jane Voorhees Zimmerli Art Museum at Rutgers University, USA
 The Nasher Museum of Art at Duke University, USA

References 

 Matthias Arndt (ed.): Erik Bulatov. Paintings 1952-2011. Catalogue raisonné in two volumes, volume 1. Compiled by Kristin Rieber. With an essay by Yevgeny Barabanov. Wienand, Cologne 2011, . Russian/English.
 Erik Bulatov. Paris: Centre Georges Pompidou, 1988. 
 Erik Boulatov. Dina Vierny Foundation, Paris: Musee Maillol, 2000.
 Erik Bulatov Oleg Vassiliev. New York: Phyllis Kind Gallery, 1991.
 Bulatov, Erik and Oleg Vassiliev, illustrators.  The Mitten: A Ukrainian Fairy Tale, Moscow: Malysh Publishers, 1979.
 Erik Bulatov: Freedom Is Freedom. DAP, 2007. .
 Erik Bulatov. That's It. Moscow: Knigi WAM, 2006 (in Russian and English). .
 Jolles, Claudia et al. Erik Bulatov: Moscow, Zürich and London: Parkett and ICA, 1989.

External links 
 Kolodzei Collection of Russian and Eastern European Art, Kolodzei Art Foundation 
 Art4.ru Contemporary Art Museum 
 The Norton & Nancy Dodge Collection of Nonconformist Art from the Soviet Union (1956–1986), Zimmerli Art Museum 

1933 births
20th-century Russian painters
Russian male painters
21st-century Russian painters
Soviet Nonconformist Art
Living people
Russian contemporary artists
20th-century Russian male artists
21st-century Russian male artists